Antona is a surname.  Notable people with this name include the following:

Middle name
Derek Antona Traversi, known as Derek A. Traversi (1912 – 2005), British literary critic

Surname
Andreas Antona (born 1957), British chef and restaurateur
Nuria Bermúdez Antona, known as Nuria Bermúdez (born 1980), Spanish football agent and actress
Piero Antona (1912 – 1969), Italian football player

See also

Antoan
Anton (given name)
Anton (surname)
Antone
Antonia (name)
Antono (name)
Antuna
Vince Dantona
Fernando Antogna